Quintus Volusius Flaccus Cornelianus was a Roman Senator who lived during the 2nd century. He was ordinary consul in 174 as the colleague of Lucius Aurelius Gallus.

Little is known on his origins and life. Cornelianus was a member of the gens Volusia. He may have been a descendant of Quintus Volusius Saturninus, consul of 92.

The name of Cornelianus is mentioned in a Roman papyrus written between 193 and 197. The papyrus, written in Latin and Greek, contains a list of soldiers in some type of military unit, perhaps cavalrymen. It was probably later reused as an envelope for a letter or a small object.

References

Sources
 Brian Jones, The Emperor Domitian, Routledge, 2002
 Advanced Papyrological Information System, UM, P.Mich.inv. 3240; Recto

2nd-century Romans
Imperial Roman consuls
Flaccus Cornelianus